Catherine Irene Jacqueline Meyer, Baroness Meyer,  (née Laylle; born 26 January 1953) is a British Life Peer and a former business woman.  She is the widow of Sir Christopher Meyer, the former British Ambassador to the United States. In 1999, she founded the charity PACT, now Action Against Abduction. In October 2020, she was appointed as the Prime Minister's Trade Envoy to Ukraine.

Background
Meyer was educated at the French Lycée in London, the School of Slavonic and East European Studies and the London School of Economics.  She began her career in financial services and became a licensed commodity broker in 1979, working for Merrill Lynch, Dean Witter and E.F. Hutton.

Biography and child advocacy
Despite her having custody of the children, her German ex-husband refused to return them to London after a summer holiday visit in 1994. This led to her almost decade-long legal battle in the German and English courts to gain access to her sons. Her account of these events is found in her two books.

In October 1997, she married Christopher Meyer on the eve of his departure to Washington to become British Ambassador to the United States. During their five and a half years in America, she campaigned against international parental child abduction alongside a number of American parents in a similar situation with Germany.

In 1998, she co-founded with Ernie Allen the International Centre for Missing & Exploited Children (ICMEC),. In 2000, she established her own organisation PACT, renamed Action Against Abduction (AAA) in 2015, affiliated to NCMEC and ICMEC.

During her time in Washington D.C., Meyer co-chaired with Ernie Allen two international conferences on improving the effectiveness of the Hague Convention on the Civil Aspects of International Child Abduction and gave evidence to committees of the United States House of Representatives and the US Senate which led to several concurrent resolutions urging better compliance by certain signatory states, including Germany, with the Hague Convention 1996; and persuaded both Presidents Clinton and Bush to raise with the German Chancellor cases of parental child abduction to Germany, including her own.

She has also taken her campaign against international parental child abduction to Europe, giving evidence before the Belgian Senate; successfully lobbying the EU to tighten its rules against parental child abduction; and, together with ICMEC, persuading the Permanent Bureau of the Hague Convention to produce a good practice guide to the implementation of the Convention.

In the UK, Meyer instigated adjournment debates in the House of Commons on her case and the issue of parental child abduction in general across frontiers. In 2005, the Parliamentary Ombudsman upheld her complaint of maladministration against the then Lord Chancellor's Department with regard to the handling of her case.

Since 2003 and her return to the UK from America, she has broadened AAA's mission to embrace children who go missing for any reason. This has led to close co-operation with the Home Office, the police, CEOP and other charities. She was a member of the Home Secretary's Strategic Oversight Group on missing people, created in 2006 by David Blunkett. Her campaigns have focussed on the difficulties of measuring exactly how many children go missing every year; the adoption by police forces of the Missingkids Website; and the Child Rescue Alert.<ref>{{Cite web |url=http://www.npia.police.uk/cra |title=Rescue Alert |access-date=11 June 2011 |archive-url=https://web.archive.org/web/20110729094306/http://www.npia.police.uk/cra/ |archive-date=29 July 2011 |url-status=dead }}</ref> On 25 May 2011, International Missing Children's Day, the Home Office announced major changes to child protection services in the UK, in particular the passing of responsibility for missing, abducted and exploited children to the Child Exploitation and Online Protection agency (CEOP). This was the culmination of a ten-year lobbying campaign. Meyer's role was recognised in the Home Office press release.

Reunited with her sons
When Alexander and Constantin reached adulthood, they made contact with Meyer.  She commented in interviews that they would have turned out differently if she raised them, but she is extremely proud of them.  Both sons still live in Germany.

Politics
In 2003, Meyer was co-chair of Vote 2004, which campaigned for a referendum on the still-born European Constitution. She was a National Treasurer of the Conservative Party between 2010 and 2015.

Directorships
From 2003 to 2007 she was a non-executive director of LIFFE (London International Financial Futures and Options Exchange).

From 2013 to 2014 she was a trustee of the London Institute for Mathematical Sciences.

Awards
In 1999, Meyer received the Adam Walsh Rainbow Award for outstanding contribution to children's causes and was named by British Airways Business Life magazine for her campaigning on behalf of abducted children.

Meyer was appointed Commander of the Order of the British Empire (CBE) in the 2012 Birthday Honours for services to children and families.

Meyer was created a Life Peer on 19 June 2018 taking the title Baroness Meyer, of Nine Elms in the London Borough of Wandsworth.

Meyer delivered her maiden speech on 11 September 2018.

Books
 Catherine Laylle (1997), Two Children Behind a Wall, Arrow Books Ltd.
 Catherine Meyer (1999), These are My Children, Too'', PublicAffairs, US

See also
 International child abduction

References

External links
Action Against Abduction
International Centre for Missing & Exploited Children

London School of Slavonic and East European Studies
UK’s child protection centre to lead national response on missing children, Home Office, 25 May 2011

1953 births
Living people
Conservative Party (UK) life peers
Life peers created by Elizabeth II
Commanders of the Order of the British Empire
British human rights activists
Women human rights activists
Children's rights activists
Anti–human trafficking activists